This article is about the particular significance of the decade 1870–1879 to Wales and its people.

Incumbents
Prince of Wales – Albert Edward
Princess of Wales – Alexandra
Archdruid of the National Eisteddfod of Wales – Clwydfardd (from 1876)

Events
1870
1871
1872
1873
1874
1875
1876
1877
1878
1879

Arts and literature

Awards
National Eisteddfod of Wales – no National Eisteddfod officially took place during this decade.
1872 – William Thomas (Islwyn) wins a bardic chair at Rhyl.
1874 – Islwyn wins a bardic chair at Caerphilly.
1877 – Islwyn wins a bardic chair at Treherbert.

New books
R. D. Blackmore – The Maid of Sker (1872)
Rhoda Broughton – Nancy (1873)
Richard Davies (Mynyddog)
Yr Ail Gynnig (1870)
Y Trydydd Cynnig (1877)
Robert Elis (Cynddelw) – Manion Hynafiaethol (1873)
Beriah Gwynfe Evans – Owain Glyndwr (play) (1879)
Daniel Silvan Evans – Celtic Remains (1878)
John Ceiriog Hughes – Oriau'r Haf (1870)
William Rees (Gwilym Hiraethog)
Helyntion Bywyd Hen Deiliwr (1877)
Llythyrau 'Rhen Ffarmwr (1878)
Thomas Thomas (minister) – Hynodion Hen Bregethwyr Cymru (1872)

Music
1873
Henry Brinley Richards – Songs of Wales

Sport
1873 – Major Walter Wingfield of Nantclwyd Hall patents nets for the game of lawn tennis, which he calls "sphairistike".

Births
1870
18 August – William Cope, 1st Baron Cope, politician (died 1946)
27 September – Thomas Jones (T. J.), civil servant (died 1955)
20 December – Sir Sir David Davies, politician (died 1958)
1871
6 April – Prince Alexander John of Wales, youngest son of the Prince and Princess of Wales (died 7 April 1871)
1872
18 May – Bertrand Russell, philosopher (died 1970)
27 August – Charles Stewart Rolls, aviator (died 1910)
8 October – John Cowper Powys, Anglo-Welsh writer (died 1963)
1873
23 April – Sir Robert Thomas, 1st Baronet, politician (died 1951)
1874
6 February – David Evans, composer (died 1948)
3 October – James Henry Thomas, politician (died 1949)
December – Nantlais Williams, poet and religious leader (died 1959)
date unknown – Albert Bethel, politician (died 1935)
1875
10 September – John Evans, Welsh politician (died 1961)
11 November – Johnny Jenkins, racing driver (died 1945)
1876
22 June – Gwen John, artist (died 1939)
18 September – Charles Kemeys-Tynte, 8th Baron Wharton (died 1934)
1877
19 August – John Evans, supercentenarian (died 1990)
26 September – Edmund Gwenn, actor (died 1959) (long believed to have been born in Wales, but birth certificate proves otherwise)
1878
4 January – Augustus John, painter (died 1961)
3 March – Edward Thomas, poet (died 1917)
16 April – Owen Thomas Jones, geologist (died 1967)
26 May – Abel J. Jones, writer (died 1949)
28 June – Evan Roberts preacher (died 1951)
31 December – Caradoc Evans, writer (died 1945)
1879
4 September – Eliot Crawshay-Williams, politician and writer (died 1962)
2 October – Idris Bell, papyrologist (died 1967)

Deaths
1872
3 August – William Davies Evans, chess player (born 1790)
1874
19 April – Owen Jones, architect (born 1809)
1875
27 July – Connop Thirlwall, bishop (born 1797)
1876
19 July – George E. Pugh, Welsh-American politician (born 1822)
1877
24 June – Robert Dale Owen, Welsh-American politician (born 1801)
14 July – Richard Davies (Mynyddog), poet (born 1833)
5 August – Robert Williams (Trebor Mai), poet (born 1830)
1878
3 January – Morris Williams (Nicander), writer (born 1809)
30 September – Evan James, poet, lyricist of the Welsh national anthem (born 1809)
20 November – William Thomas (Islwyn), poet (born 1832)
1879
23 September – Francis Kilvert, diarist (born 1840)